Becks may refer to:

People
 Becks (surname), a European surname
 David Beckham, English footballer

Other uses
 Becks (film), a 2017 American film
 Becks, New Zealand
 Beck's Brewery, a brewery in Bremen, Germany

See also
 
 Beck (disambiguation)
 Becs (disambiguation)
 Bex (disambiguation)